"Marge Gets a Job" is the seventh episode of the fourth season of the American animated television series The Simpsons. It originally aired on the Fox network in the United States on November 5, 1992. In this episode, Marge gets a job at the Springfield Nuclear Power Plant to pay for foundation repair at the Simpson house. Mr. Burns develops a crush on Marge after seeing her at work and attempts to woo her. A subplot with Bart also takes place, paralleling the fable The Boy Who Cried Wolf.

The episode was written by Bill Oakley and Josh Weinstein and directed by Jeffrey Lynch.

Plot
Homer and Marge discover that their house is partially sinking. Homer tries to repair it, but fails. He decides to call a foundation repairman: the repair will cost $8,500. Homer takes Marge to a party for the enforced retirement of Springfield Nuclear Power Plant employee Jack Marley. Marge decides to apply for the position now open so that they can pay for the foundation repair. Lisa helps her write a résumé, and Marge gets the job. Mr. Burns is enchanted by Marge, but when she tells him that she is married he dismisses her. She threatens a lawsuit and enlists the help of Lionel Hutz, who is completely unsuccessful and flees from Burns' army of real lawyers; but Burns yields after Homer defends his wife. The episode ends as Homer and Marge enjoy a private show performed by the singer Tom Jones, who is being held captive by Burns following Marge's revelation that she is a fan of Jones's music, and secretly begs Marge to help him escape.

Meanwhile, at school, Bart does not want to take a test, so he fakes a stomach ache. Edna Krabappel asks if Bart has ever read The Boy Who Cried Wolf. When Bart returns to school, Edna suggests that he take a make-up test, but he evades it. Grampa comes to pick him up and on the way home references The Boy Who Cried Wolf. Again, Bart is unfazed. When he returns to school again, he is forced to take the test. He protests, but Edna ignores him. She places him alone outside the classroom, hands him the test, and leaves.

At Krustylu Studios, the taping of Krusty the Clown's latest show features a wildlife expert, showing a hawk and a wolf. She warns that the wolf is spooked by loud noises. But "loud" is the secret word of the day. Celebration and noise ensue, causing the wolf to panic and escape. Roaming freely, it runs to Springfield Elementary School, where it attacks Bart outside the classroom. He cries "Wolf!" but Edna ignores him. Groundskeeper Willie rescues Bart by fighting the wolf, giving Bart time to return to his classroom. Since he feels that he will not be believed if he tells the truth, Bart says, with apparent honesty, that he made up the story. He then passes out and Edna realizes that Bart really was attacked. Grampa takes him home, while Willie gives the wolf some alcohol and consoles him for losing.

Production

The idea for the show came from Conan O'Brien, who thought of Marge getting a job at the power plant and that Mr. Burns has a crush on her. The animators had trouble animating Marge with the suit and lipstick. Director Jeff Lynch said there were a few scenes where Marge "looks like a monster". All the jargon used by Troy McClure was accurately taken from a Time–Life foundation repair book. The original subplot for the episode was Mr. Burns telling Homer to dress up as Mister Atom and have him go to schools to talk to the children. The cast really liked Tom Jones as a guest star. They said he was fun to work with, and was really nice, and even offered to perform a concert after he was done recording lines.

The animators had originally drawn three different versions of Bart after he was attacked by the wolf. They picked the version that looked the least scary, as they did not want Bart to look too "beaten up". An animation error during the dream sequence with Mr. Burns also caused issues when dealing with network censors, mistaking a "lump in his bed" as an erection, which was supposed to be Mr. Smithers' knee.

Cultural references
The song performed for Mr. Burns at the retirement party is a reference to Citizen Kane. The photo of Mr. Burns meeting Elvis Presley is very close to the photo of Richard Nixon meeting Elvis. While Mr. Burns is looking through the surveillance cameras, "The Imperial March" from the Star Wars films is played in the background.

Reception

Critical reception
Warren Martyn and Adrian Wood, the authors of the book I Can't Believe It's a Bigger and Better Updated Unofficial Simpsons Guide commented, "We like Bart's fantasy of the radioactive Marie and Pierre Curie, and Smithers' fantasy of his loved one flying through the window. A collection of wonderful set pieces rather than a story, which fizzles out without any real attempt at an ending."

Empire placed the "Mister Burns" dance number as the show's fourth best film parody, "the pick of a big bunch" from the show's many Citizen Kane parodies, coming "replete with Wellesian camera angles and subtly altered lyrics".

Ratings
In its original broadcast, "Marge Gets a Job" finished 25th in ratings for the week of November 2–8, 1992, with a Nielsen rating of 13.6, equivalent to approximately 12.7 million viewing households. It was the highest-rated show on the Fox network that week, beating Beverly Hills, 90210 and The Simpsons episode "Itchy & Scratchy: The Movie", which aired on Tuesday in the same week.

Alternate version
In the original airing of this episode, Mrs. Krabappel names several different diseases Bart has faked in order to get out of taking his English test, one of which is Tourette's syndrome. After Bart claims that he is not over it, he begins barking and snarling and mutters, "Shove it, witch!" This scene garnered many complaints from people who thought it was tasteless of the writers to make fun of an actual condition and Joshua Smith, a boy in Renton, Washington began seeking legal action. Smith demanded that they "not repeat the episode and have Bart Simpson befriend somebody with Tourette's on the show" and include an apology from Bart at the end. Executive producer Mike Reiss replied with an apology saying "We kind of feel like we made a mistake this time. We felt bad about this." In a move that was unprecedented for the show, the producers agreed to remove the scene from future broadcasts. However, Smith's other requests went unfulfilled. In the version of the episode released on the season four DVD boxset, the part with Bart demonstrating his supposed Tourette's syndrome to Mrs. Krabappel was kept intact, but Krabappel's line about Bart having "...that unfortunate bout of Tourette's syndrome" was replaced with "...that unfortunate bout of rabies."

Additionally, during Smithers' dream sequence with Mr. Burns, censors demanded the cutting of several seconds of animation that showed "Mr. Burns land[ing] in a particular position on Smithers anatomy".

Following the 2011 Tōhoku earthquake and tsunami and the associated nuclear emergency, the episode was pulled from an Austrian network due to jokes about radiation poisoning.

References

External links

The Simpsons (season 4) episodes
1992 American television episodes
Cultural depictions of Marie Curie
Cultural depictions of Elvis Presley
Television episodes about sexual harassment